Joseph Mbazumutima (born 11 April 1937) was a Burundian politician.

Early life 
Joseph Mbazumutima was born on 11 April 1937 into a Ganwa family. He was educated at the Groupe Scolaire de Astrida.

Career 
Mbazumutima served as the private secretary of Mwami Mwambutsa IV, his second cousin, from 1955 to 1961. In September 1961 he was elected to the Legislative Assembly as a member of the Union for National Progress (Union pour le Progrès national, UPRONA) party. He adhered to the Casblanca faction in the body. The government considered making him an ambassador to either the United States or the Soviet Union, but he was never given such an appointment. 

In January 1963 Mbazumutima was appointed chief administrator of the Institut Murundi d'Information et de Documentation. In May he was appointed Grand Marshall of the Royal Court. He was appointed Minister of Foreign Affairs on 6 April 1964. By 1966 he was serving as the administrator of the Burundian National Bank. He was dismissed in November 1968.

References

Works cited 
 
 

1937 births
Living people
Ganwa people
Union for National Progress politicians
Foreign ministers of Burundi